This is a list of Texas Union Army units that served in the American Civil War. The Confederate civil war units are listed separately. Although Texas seceded in 1861, there was a pro-Union minority within the state that organized several units for the Union Army. It is estimated that some 2,000 Texans served the Union during the war.

1st Texas Cavalry Regiment
2nd Texas Cavalry Regiment (merged with 1st Texas Cavalry Regiment in 1864)
2nd Texas Cavalry Regiment (1865)
Hamilton's Body Guard, Texas Cavalry
Independent Partisan Rangers, Texas Cavalry

See also
Texas in the American Civil War
List of American Civil War regiments by state
Southern Unionists

References

External links
National Park Service Civil War Soldiers and Sailors Website
Texas Union Army units at The Civil War Archive, Union Regimental Index

Texas
Civil War Union units